In the Turn is a 2014 documentary film directed by Erica Tremblay. It was produced by Tremblay, Bernard Parham, and Bodie Scott-Orman.

The film won Best New Mavericks Feature at the Atlanta Film Festival and awards at several LGBT film festivals. It was also shown at about fifty different film festivals including Inside Out Toronto LGBT Film Festival, Seattle Lesbian & Gay Film Festival, and the Ottawa International Film Festival.

Premise 
Through original documentary filming, interviews, online vlog footage, news footage, and archival audio, In the Turn documents the story of Crystal, a transgender girl living in Timmins, Ontario. After discovering Vagine Regime, a roller derby association, with her mother, she expressed interest in the sport. Her mother wrote a message to the organization which raised money to sponsor Crystal as she traveled to the United States to enroll in short roller derby camp. The documentary also recounts the stories of several members of Vagine Regime and the general roller derby community. The film features interviews with transgender members of roller derby teams, fans and a referee, who describe how the community has helped them cope with their transitions.

Reception 
According to Regan Reid from Vice, the film focuses on the positive effects of the roller derby community rather than the "devastating aspects" of Crystal's life. Instead of concentrating on the struggles faced by members the LBGT community, it instead focuses on their day to day lives. The film has received generally positive reviews. According to The Roaming Life, "The film clearly demonstrates the importance of finding a community full of people you can look up to when you’re young and transgender." It describes the film as an example of "the power that cinema can have". Pat Mullen, a member of the Online Film Critics Society, describes the film as an "inspiring and empowering" documentary but criticized the stories beginning as "a bit unfocused as Tremblay and editor Dan Litzinger crosscut almost too many stories".

References

External links 
 

American sports documentary films
2014 documentary films
2014 LGBT-related films
Films shot in Ontario
Films shot in Los Angeles County, California
Films shot in San Francisco
Films shot in Austin, Texas
Films shot in New York City
Films shot in Minnesota
Transgender-related documentary films
American LGBT-related films